State Route 227 (SR 227) is a primary state highway in the U.S. state of Virginia. Known for much of its length as Urbanna Road, the state highway runs  from SR 33 near Saluda north to SR 602 in Urbanna in central Middlesex County.

Route description

SR 227 begins at an intersection with SR 33 (Lewis Puller Memorial Highway) east of Saluda. The state highway heads north as two-lane undivided Urbanna Road, which passes through a mix of forest and farmland. SR 227 crosses Urbanna Creek, a tributary of the Rappahannock River, into the town of Urbanna and veers west onto Watling Street. The state highway makes a right-angle turn north onto Cross Street and, two blocks later, a right-angle turn west onto Virginia Street. SR 227 follows Virginia Street west to its western terminus at the western town limit of Urbanna west of Waverly Road. The roadway continues as SR 602 (Old Virginia Street) to U.S. Route 17 (Tidewater Trail) northwest of Saluda.

Major intersections

References

External links

Virginia Highways Project: VA 227

227
State Route 227